The Croatian Defence Council ( or HVO)  was the official military formation of the Croatian Republic of Herzeg-Bosnia, an unrecognized entity that existed in Bosnia and Herzegovina between 1991 and 1996. The HVO was the main military force of Croats of Bosnia and Herzegovina.

In the initial stage of the Bosnian War, the HVO fought alongside the Army of the Republic of Bosnia and Herzegovina (ARBiH) against the Bosnian Serbs, but in the latter stage of the conflict clashed against its former ally, particularly in the Mostar area. The European Community Monitoring Mission (ECMM) estimated the strength of the HVO in the beginning of 1993 at 45,000–55,000. In July 1993, CIA estimated the HVO forces at 40,000 to 50,000 men.

HVO was incorporated into the Army of the Federation of Bosnia and Herzegovina (VFBiH) in December 1995 by following agreement made after signing the Dayton Accords. In December 2005 HVO was reorganized as 1st Infantry (Guard) Regiment of the Armed Forces of Bosnia and Herzegovina, after VFBiH and Army of Republika Srpska were united into a single armed force.

History
The HVO (Croatian Defence Council) was established on 8 April 1992 in Grude by the political leadership of Croats, mainly members of Croatian Democratic Union (Hrvatska demokratska zajednica) as a military formation of Herzeg-Bosnia.

Commanders
 April 1992 – ?, Brigadier General Milivoj Petković;
 July – November 1993, Mayor General Slobodan Praljak;
 November 1993 – ?, Lieutenant general Ante Roso;
 ? – August 1994 Major general Milivoj Petković;
 August 1994 – November 1995, Major General Tihomir Blaškić

Organization

HVO was located in Mostar and was divided into four corps-status operational zones: 1OZ/South-Eastern (Herzegovina) and 2OZ/North-Western Herzegovina, 3OZ/Central Bosnia and 4OZ/Posavina. While first three zones were grouped more or less together, Posavina was completely isolated in northern Bosnia on right bank of Sava river around Orašje and was entirely dependent on support from Croatia. There was also an HCO headquarters in the Bihac enclave which liaised with the ARBiH 5th corps. Each OZ controlled 8-14 infantry brigades, a military police battalion and an MP "Light Assault Battalion".

The HVO also included the brigade sized Ante Bruno Bušić Regiment manned by full-time soldiers, two independent infantry battalions, a light anti-aircraft artillery battalion, Special Forces and artillery units. In early 1993 the HVO Home Guard was formed in order to provide support for the brigades. The HVO forces became better organized as time passed by, but they started creating guards brigades, mobile units of professional soldiers, only in early 1994.

Guard brigades
1. Guard Brigade "Bruno Bušić"
2. Guard Brigade
3. Guard Brigade "Hawks"
4. Guard Brigade "Sons of Posavina"

The Guards brigades were the sections of the HVO which handled its heavy weapons. The HVO had around 50 tanks, 400 artillery pieces, and 200 armored troop carriers. A brigade numbered between a few hundred to several thousand men, but most had 2–3,000.

Other brigades
There were 38 infantry brigades staffed by reservists, 19 had names and/or numbers and 19 only had names. The names commemorated famous or infamous figures from Croatian and Bosnian history. Each brigade had three or four battalions plus supporting elements. Two, the 107th and 109th were later transferred en masse to the ARBiH due to their Muslim majorities, as did the Muslim contingent of the 108th Brigade who went on to form the ARBiH's 108 Motorised Brigade. The 107th became the ARBiH 107th "Chilvalrous" Brigade while the 109th became the 109th Mountain Brigade.

1993 restructuring

In 1993 General Ante Roso restructured the HVO along the lines of the Croatian Army (HV). The four OZ's were designated as Corps Districts Mostar, Tomislavgrad, Vitez and Orašje. Orašje included a much reduced Bosanska Posavina. Four Guards Brigades were formed, each manned by full-time professional soldiers. 29 brigades were reformed as three-battalion strong Home Defense Regiments (domobranska pukovnija), usually with the same name and depot. Four brigades were disbanded. The military police were reduced to one Light Assault Brigade at Mostar.

Eight HVO units served with the ARBiH while two HVO brigades were forcibly incorporated into the ARBiH. The 115th Brigade became part of the ARBiH 2nd Corps while the King Tvrtko Brigade became part of the ARBiH 1st Corps.

HVO aviation
The HVO Air Forces and Anti-aircraft Artillery was formed in 1992 and consisted of the 11th Combined Squadron, operated helicopters and transports, and the 121st Observation Squadron which operated various civilian light aircraft in an observation and communications role. There was also the 14th Anti-aircraft Missile Unit which operated several different SAM systems.

See also

 Croatian Army
 Croatian Defence Forces
 Roland Bartetzko

References

Works cited

External links

 
History of the Croats of Bosnia and Herzegovina
Military units and formations established in 1992
Military units and formations disestablished in 2005
2005 disestablishments in Bosnia and Herzegovina